Traditional Home  was a design and decorating magazine that targeted affluent readers. The magazine was published by the Meredith Corporation and celebrated the pleasures of modern life through the prism of classic taste. It was the best-selling shelter magazine at newsstands for nine consecutive years. Launched in 1989 under the direction of founding editor Karol DeWulf Nickell, Traditional Home was published eight times a year until 2017 when it was redesigned to produce six volumes per year. It reached 4.5 million readers. The magazine ceased publication with the Fall/Winter 2019 issue.

Leadership 
Ann Maine was the editor-in-chief of Traditional Home, a position she assumed in 2002. Maine had over 20 years of experience as an editor in the shelter magazine category during which she held editorial leadership positions at Country Home, Renovation Style, Country Gardens and the Better Homes and Gardens Special Interest Media publications.

Marsha Raisch, the executive editor of Traditional Home, assisted editor-in-chief Ann Maine in setting the editorial direction and overall content for the Traditional Home. Prior to Traditional Home, Raisch held several editorial positions at Better Homes and Gardens Special Interest Media group including editor of Kitchen and Bath Ideas and Editorial Manager for the Building/Remodeling/Kitchens division where she directed and oversaw 16 special interest titles, including: Beautiful New Homes, Remodeling Ideas, Beautiful Kitchens, Kitchen Planning Guide, and Kitchen & Bath Products Guide.

Kathryn Finney was the art director of Traditional Home. She worked with editor-in-chief Ann Maine and a design staff to produce and constantly present a fresh look for Traditional Home. This involved working with internal and external photographers, illustrators, graphic designers, separators and printers to produce Traditional Home eight times a year. Finney joined Traditional Home in 2002 from Renovation Style with more than 20 years experience career as an art director and graphic designer.

Other editors
Michael Diver, Managing Editor
Candace Ord Manroe, Senior Decorating Editor
Robert Young, Senior Interior Design and Projects Editor
Krissa Rossbund, Design Editor
Amy Elbert, Senior Architecture Editor
Doris Athineos, Senior Art and Antiques Editor
Ethne Clarke, Garden Editor
Jenny Bradley, Lifestyle and Events Editor

References

 Traditional Home mission statement, 2006
 Audit Bureau of Circulation (ABC) statements, 1991-2005
 Fall 2006 Mediamark Research Inc. (MRI) statistics

External links
Traditional Home website

Bimonthly magazines published in the United States
Defunct magazines published in the United States
Defunct Meredith Corporation magazines
Design magazines
Eight times annually magazines published in the United States
Lifestyle magazines published in the United States
Magazines established in 1989
Magazines disestablished in 2019
Magazines published in Iowa
Magazines published in New York City
Mass media in Des Moines, Iowa